The 1930 Ball State Cardinals football team was an American football team that represented Ball State Teachers College (later renamed Ball State University) as a member of the Indiana Intercollegiate Conference during the 1930 college football season. In its first season under head coach Lawrence McPhee, the team compiled a 6–1 record and outscored opponents by a total of 136 to 32.

Schedule

References

Ball State
Ball State Cardinals football seasons
Ball State Cardinals football